In mathematics, a pointed space or based space is a topological space with a distinguished point, the basepoint. The distinguished point is just simply one particular point, picked out from the space, and given a name, such as  that remains unchanged during subsequent discussion, and is kept track of during all operations.

Pointed spaces are important in algebraic topology, particularly in homotopy theory, where many constructions, such as the fundamental group, depend on a choice of basepoint.

The pointed set concept is less important; it is anyway the case of a pointed discrete space.

Pointed spaces are often taken as a special case of the relative topology, where the subset is a single point.  Thus, much of homotopy theory is usually developed on pointed spaces, and then moved to relative topologies in algebraic topology.

Category of pointed spaces 

The class of all pointed spaces forms a category Top with basepoint preserving continuous maps as morphisms. Another way to think about this category is as the comma category, ( Top) where  is any one point space and Top is the category of topological spaces. (This is also called a coslice category denoted Top.) Objects in this category are continuous maps  Such maps can be thought of as picking out a basepoint in  Morphisms in ( Top) are morphisms in Top for which the following diagram commutes:

It is easy to see that commutativity of the diagram is equivalent to the condition that  preserves basepoints.

As a pointed space,  is a zero object in Top, while it is only a terminal object in Top.

There is a forgetful functor Top  Top which "forgets" which point is the basepoint.

Operations on pointed spaces 

 A subspace of a pointed space  is a topological subspace  which shares its basepoint with  so that the inclusion map is basepoint preserving.
 One can form the quotient of a pointed space  under any equivalence relation. The basepoint of the quotient is the image of the basepoint in  under the quotient map.
 One can form the product of two pointed spaces   as the topological product  with serving as the basepoint.
 The smash product of two pointed spaces is essentially the quotient of the direct product and the wedge sum. We would like to say that the smash product turns the category of pointed spaces into a symmetric monoidal category with the pointed 0-sphere as the unit object, but this is false for general spaces: the associativity condition might fail. But it is true for some more restricted categories of spaces, such as compactly generated weak Hausdorff ones.
 The reduced suspension is a functor from the category of pointed spaces to itself. This functor is left adjoint to the functor  taking a pointed space  to its loop space .

See also

References 

 
 

 mathoverflow discussion on several base points and groupoids 

Topology
Homotopy theory
Categories in category theory
Topological spaces